The sixty-fourth Oregon Legislative Assembly convened for its regular session from January 12 to June 28, 1987, a total of 168 days.

Both chambers were controlled by the Democratic Party of Oregon. The House speaker was Vera Katz (D–10 Portland), and the Senate president was John Kitzhaber (D–23 Roseburg).

Democrat Neil Goldschmidt was governor of Oregon during the 64th legislature.

Senate

House 

 Darlene Hooley resigned  to accept appointment to the Washington County Board of Commissioners. Judie Hammerstad was appointed  to fill the vacancy.

 Ron Eachus resigned  to accept appointment as Public Utility Commissioner. Jim Edmunson was appointed  to fill the vacancy.

 George Trahern resigned his House seat to accept appointment to the Senate in March 1988. Bob Repine was appointed to fill the vacancy.

See also 
 List of Oregon ballot measures#1987

References

External links 
 https://sos.oregon.gov/archives/Pages/records/legislators_guide.aspx

Oregon legislative sessions
1987 in Oregon
1988 in Oregon